Ana González Rodríguez (born 26 August 1970), better known as Ana Locking, is a Spanish fashion designer, business woman and photographer. She was born in Toledo and educated in Madrid. Ana is also a judge on Drag Race España.

Career 

In 1997, Ana Locking, together with Óscar Benito, founded Locking Shocking, a ready-to-wear label claiming to maintain "strong ties with other artistic disciplines". The team received accolades: in 2003, the young designer's Premio L'Oreal and in 2004, from the Spanish Marie Claire, a Gran Prix de la moda. Their partnership lasted until 2007 when the label disappeared further to the decision of their business partner, Humana Cultura y Comunicación.

In 2008 she launched alone a new ready-to-wear label, Ana Locking, which also received accolades: in 2008, the Premio L'Oréal in 2009, the Premio Mujer Fun Fearless Female, awarded by the Spanish Cosmopolitan. in 2020, the National Fashion Design Award, awarded by the Ministry of Culture of Spain  in 2021, the Gold Medal of Merit in Fine Arts, awarded by the Ministry of Culture of Spain  in 2022, the Madrid Culture Award’’, awarded by the Community of Madrid  

In 2021, Ana Locking was a regular member of the judges panel of Drag Race España''.

Personal life
In 2020, Locking was diagnosed with breast cancer, a few days later she underwent surgery and started radiotherapy. In July 2020, it was confirmed that she was cured.

Filmography

Exhibitions 

 Back to the Roots Installation - Fashion Collective (Gabarron Foundation- NY) 
 4EYES Video Art - Fashion Collective (New York Public Library - NY) 
 Man in a Skirt Fashion Collective (El Casino de la Expo - Sevilla)
 Fashion and the Classics Fashion Collective (Museo Nacional del Teatro - Almagro) 
 SkyLight Fashion Collective (Trump Soho - NY)
 Bipolar Installation / sculpture (Forum of Cultures - Barcelona)
 Regret Installation / sculpture (MUSAC - León) 
 Nancy dresses in fashion Collective (Museo del Traje - Madrid) 
 20 Icons of the 20th Century Fashion Collective (Museo del Traje - Madrid) 
 Not for Three Installation - Video Art (Real Fábrica de Tapices - Madrid)
 21 Turns to a bag Fashion Collective (IVAM - Valencia) 
 Fahrenheit Photography / Video Art (Casa de América - Madrid)
 Köning Video Art (Circuit - Barcelona)

Awards 

Madrid Culture Award (2022).
National Gold Medal of Merit in the Fine Arts (2021).
National Fashion Design Award (2020).
Medal of Merit for Fine Arts of Castilla La Mancha - First Edition 2017.
 MadWoman Award - Best Designer, 2017.
 Cosmopolitan Fun Fearless Female - Best Designer 2009. 
 CLM Design - Best Designer 2009.
 L’Oréal Paris - Best Mercedes-Benz Fashion Week collection for "Reentry" - February 2008. 
 Ingenio 400. Audience Award for the video "Fahrenheit" - 2007
 Gran Prix Marie Claire - Best National Designer - Locking Shocking - 2004. 
 L’Oréal Paris Best young collection for "Eólica" Locking Shocking - Summer 2003 
 "Generación Joven" Finalist Caja Madrid "From 35 to 45" - 2002
 "Generación Joven" Finalist Caja Madrid "12 Portraits" - 2001

References

External links 

Spanish fashion designers
Spanish artists
1970 births
Living people
High fashion brands
Luxury brands
Clothing companies of Spain
Clothing brands of Spain
Spanish women artists
Spanish women fashion designers
Drag Race España